During the 2009–10 English football season, Brentford competed in Football League One. In the Bees' first League One season since 2006–07, the club finished in 9th place and reached the third round of the FA Cup.

Season summary 

After promotion back to League One as League Two champions at the end of the 2008–09 season, Brentford manager Andy Scott immediately cleared all the bit-part and injury-prone players out of his squad, releasing 13. In came goalkeepers Lewis Price on a season-long loan and Nikki Bull on a one-year contract, three defenders (Alan Bennett, Danny Foster and Leon Legge), midfielder Sam Saunders, left winger Myles Weston and three forwards (Carl Cort, Steve Kabba and Ben Strevens). Popular forward Nathan Elder departed Griffin Park in early August 2009 and dropped back down to League Two to sign for Shrewsbury Town for an undisclosed fee. Scott would sign three more players between the beginning of the season and the end of the summer transfer window – teenager Simon Moore as third-choice goalkeeper, centre back James Wilson on a one-month loan and winger Cleveland Taylor for an undisclosed fee from Carlisle United.

Manager Andy Scott revealed that Brentford's target for the season was "to get to 52 points" and "to do the double over as many teams as possible and make sure no-one does the double over us". Despite being knocked out of the League Cup in the first round, Brentford started the league season strongly, going third after an opening-day victory over Carlisle United and then going undefeated in the following four matches to consolidate a position in the playoff zone. A 2–1 victory over promotion hopefuls Norwich City at Griffin Park on 18 August was a notable early-season highlight. As injuries mounted and some players found it difficult to replicate their League Two form in League One, manager Scott would search for a winning formula by signing 9 players on loan between November 2009 and March 2010, the most notable of whom being Arsenal goalkeeper Wojciech Szczęsny, centre back Pim Balkestein and central midfielder Toumani Diagouraga, the latter two of whom would sign permanently for the club after the season. Out of form attackers Steve Kabba and Cleveland Taylor were sent out on loan to League Two club Burton Albion, while captain Alan Bennett, who had been out of favour for most of the season, ended the campaign with two spells on loan with Wycombe Wanderers.

Aside from dropping to a season-low placing of 18th in late November and early December, Brentford trod water in mid-table for much of the season and a run of just one defeat in the final 13 matches of the season elevated the club to a credible 9th-place finish. The Bees reached the third round of the FA Cup, seeing off Conference Premier strugglers Gateshead in a replay and League One Walsall in the first two rounds, before falling to 1–0 to Championship club Doncaster Rovers in the third round at Griffin Park. There was some cheer late in the season, when supporter Matthew Benham agreed to invest £1m a year into the club, until the end of the 2013–14 season, in return for preference shares and without increasing the club's debt.

League table

Results

Pre-season

Football League One

Results by round

League position graph

Matches

FA Cup

Football League Cup

Football League Trophy

 Source: brentfordfc.co.uk

Playing squad 
Players' ages are as of the opening day of the 2009–10 season.

 Source: Soccerbase

Coaching staff

Statistics

Appearances and goals
Substitute appearances in brackets.

 Players listed in italics left the club mid-season.
 Source: Soccerbase

Goalscorers 

 Players listed in italics left the club mid-season.
 Source: Soccerbase

Discipline 

 Players listed in italics left the club mid-season.
 Source: ESPN FC

Management

Summary

Transfers & loans

Kit

|
|
|

|
|
|

Awards 
 Supporters' Player of the Year: Leon Legge
 Community Player of the Year: Karleigh Osborne
 FA Cup Player of the Round: Leon Legge (second round)
 Football League Family Excellence Award

References

Brentford F.C. seasons
Brentford